Amazing Animals (sometimes marketed as Henry's Amazing Animals for home video) is an educational children's animated TV show series nature program produced by Dorling Kindersley Vision and Partridge Films in association with The Disney Channel. It was originally broadcast on the service in 1996. It also aired on Family Channel in Canada. It is also available on VHS.

The show centers on the interactions of Henry the Lizard, a green CGI anthropomorphic lizard with purple spots, and an unseen narrator. Each episode centers on a theme relating to the episode's subject matter, such as Henry traveling through prehistory in a time machine in an episode about prehistoric animals. Henry is usually faced with some kind of predicament or work, always relating to the episode's theme, which he resolves by the end of the episode, often learning a lesson of some sort in the process.

Plot 
Each episode is made up of sections in which Henry is featured, video sequences of animals narrated by the off-screen narrator with replies by Henry, and cartoons featuring recurring unnamed cartoon animals. There are also two recurring segments: "Henry's Report" and "The Golden Gecko Awards". Early episodes depicted Henry's Report as a school report, though later episodes changed it to a news report. In either case, the report is comical and almost always wildly inaccurate. The correct information is given by The Narrator after the report.

In Henry's Amazing Golden Gecko Awards, Henry picks three animals relating to the subject of the episode and presents them with awards. Unlike the report, the Golden Gecko Awards are typically more genuine. Henry does most of the narration and often gets annoyed at the Narrator for interrupting him. Henry's Report occurred in every episode; the only episode that did not have the Golden Gecko Awards was "Underground Animals", probably because of timing issues.

Cast and major characters
Henry the Lizard: The show's main protagonist. He is a small green lizard with purple spots and yellow eyes. Henry is portrayed as being enthusiastic, albeit foolish and immature. He is generally depicted as ignorant of the episode's subject matter and typically fails in the endeavours he attempts to undertake. Sometimes, he can prove himself to be quite smart, he is also an inventor. He often identifies lizards seen in the video sequences as his cousins. His favorite food is pizza. Henry the Lizard is voiced by Eric Meyers.
The Narrator: The Narrator is Henry's co-star, but he is never seen and almost never named. He is depicted as being wise and knowledgeable. In addition to teaching Henry about animals and correcting his special reports, the Narrator acts as a comedic foil to Henry: the show's "straight man", who cuts Henry down for his immaturity and lack of knowledge with some combination of a mature seriousness and a dry sarcasm. The Narrator is voiced by Tom Clarke-Hill (and Nigel Greaves in the UK version).
Crab Tuesday: Henry met Crab Tuesday during a visit to the seashore, and the crab has been Henry's best friend and assistant ever since. Henry names him Tuesday after Robinson Crusoe's "man Friday". Henry can often tell what Tuesday is saying, although he has no voice at all and communicates by snapping his claws. However, in Amazing Animal Hunters, he is heard mumbling "I don't know" to Henry. Crab Tuesday vocal effects was provided by Fred Newman.

Episodes

Season 1 (1996)

Season 2 (1997)

Season 3 (1998)

Season 4 (1999)

Merchandise
Some merchandise was also released during the activity of the series. An educational computer game was also released with the television show. A board game known as The Really Amazing Animal Game was also sold but was shortly discontinued.

External links

List of episodes as digiguide.tv

1996 American television series debuts
1999 American television series endings
1990s American animated television series
1996 British television series debuts
1999 British television series endings
1990s British children's television series
Fictional chameleons and geckos
American children's animated adventure television series
American children's animated education television series
British children's animated adventure television series
British children's animated education television series
Animated television series about reptiles and amphibians
Disney Channel original programming
Disney animated television series
English-language television shows
American television series with live action and animation
1990s British animated television series